= Vigilant Applications =

- Company type: Private
- Industry: Software
- Founded: 2012
- Headquarters: United Kingdom
- Products: VigilancePro
- Website: vigilantapps.com

Vigilant Applications Ltd is a United Kingdom-based software company, which develops and markets the VigilancePro user behaviour monitoring and management product. The company was founded as a result of the collapse and subsequent administration of Overtis Ltd, the previous owners of VigilancePro.
